The 1979–80 Quebec Nordiques season was the Nordiques eighth season overall, however, it marked as their expansion season in the National Hockey League.  Quebec had played their previous seven seasons in the now defunct World Hockey Association.  In 1978–79, their last season in the WHA, Quebec finished the year with the second best record, as they had a 41–34–5 record, earning 87 points.  The Nordiques were then swept by the Winnipeg Jets in the WHA semi-finals. In the NHL, the team finished out of the playoffs.

Off-season
During the off-season, the Nordiques, Edmonton Oilers, New England Whalers, and Winnipeg Jets were admitted into the NHL as expansion teams.  Quebec would be placed in the Adams Division in the Wales Conference.  The other teams in the Nordiques division was the Boston Bruins, Buffalo Sabres, Minnesota North Stars and Toronto Maple Leafs.  Quebec held on to head coach Jacques Demers.

As many of the WHA players had their rights held by NHL teams, those NHL teams were allowed to reclaim their players.  In order to keep the NHL from taking all the talent from the WHA-turned-NHL teams, each incoming franchise was allowed to protect up to two goaltenders and two skaters.  These were designated as "priority selections" in the 1979 NHL Expansion Draft.  The Nordiques made a deal with the Chicago Black Hawks, in which Quebec would keep Real Cloutier in exchange for the Nordiques first round draft pick in the 1980 NHL Entry Draft. Quebec made a deal with the Montreal Canadiens in which Montreal selected Dan Geoffrion and Alain Cote from the Nordiques, rather than Marc Tardif and Richard David. In exchange for this, the Nordiques relinquished a third round pick in the 1980 NHL Entry Draft, a second round pick in the 1981 NHL Entry Draft, and that the Nordiques would draft Alain Cote from the Canadiens at the 1979 NHL Expansion Draft.

On June 28, 1979, the Nordiques acquired Jamie Hislop from the Winnipeg Jets in exchange for Barry Legge. Hislop played with the Cincinnati Stingers in the 1978–79, as he scored 30 goals and 70 points in 80 games.

The Nordiques acquired goaltender Goran Hogosta from the New York Islanders for goaltender Richard Brodeur. Hogosta played the 1978–79 season with the Fort Worth Texans, earning a record of 25–29–4 with a 3.51 GAA and a .877 save percentage. Brodeur had been with the Nordiques during their entire existence in the WHA. In 1978–79, Brodeur had a 25–13–3 record with a 3.11 GAA and a .901 save percentage with Quebec.

At the 1979 NHL Entry Draft held on August 9, the Nordiques selected Michel Goulet from the Birmingham Bulls of the World Hockey Association in the first round, 20th overall. In 78 games with the Bulls during the 1978–79, Goulet scored 28 goals and 58 points. In the second round, Quebec selected Dale Hunter from the Sudbury Wolves of the Ontario Major Junior Hockey League. Hunter scored 34 goals and 85 points in 61 games during the 1978–79 season. In the fourth round, the Nordiques selected Anton Stastny from Slovan ChZJD Bratislava of the Czechoslovak First Ice Hockey League. Stastny scored 32 goals and 51 points in 44 games during the 1978–79 season.

Quebec signed free agent Robbie Ftorek on August 13, who played the 1978–79 season with the Cincinnati Stingers of the World Hockey Association. Ftorek finished second in WHA scoring with 39 goals and 77 assists to earn 116 points in 80 games. Ftorek has previous NHL experience, as in 15 games with the Detroit Red Wings from 1972 to 1974, Ftorek scored two goals and seven points.

Regular season
Quebec played in their first ever NHL game on October 10, 1979, at Le Colisée in Quebec City, as the Nordiques lost 5–3 to the Atlanta Flames.  The Nords won their first ever NHL game in their third game, defeating the Colorado Rockies 5–2 in Denver, Colorado.  During the first half of the season, the Nordiques were very competitive, earning a 17–17–6 record as they held on to a playoff position, however, wins were few and far between in the second half of the year, as Quebec fell into last place, and finished the year 25–44–11, earning 61 points, and missing the post-season.

Offensively, the Nordiques were led by Real Cloutier, who in his first NHL season, had a team best 42 goals and 47 assists for 89 points. Real Cloutier scored three goals in his National League Debut. Marc Tardif had a solid season, scoring 33 goals and 68 points, while the Nordiques first round draft pick, Michel Goulet, had 22 goals and 54 points to finish in third in team scoring.  On the blue line, Dale Hoganson led the way, earning 40 points, while Pierre Lacroix scored 9 goals and 30 points.  Paul Baxter led the club with 145 penalty minutes.

In goal, Michel Dion saw most of the action, appearing in 50 games, earning a team high 15 victories and a 3.70 GAA, as well as two shutouts.

Season standings

Schedule and results

Player statistics

Scoring leaders

Goaltending

1979 NHL Expansion Draft

The Nordiques participated in the 1979 NHL Expansion Draft, which was held on June 13, 1979.

Quebec Nordiques selections

Draft picks
Quebec's draft picks from the 1979 NHL Entry Draft which was held at the Queen Elizabeth Hotel in Montreal, Quebec, on August 9, 1979.

Transactions
The Nordiques were involved in the following transactions during the 1979–80 season.

Trades

*Black Hawks promised to not make Real Cloutier one of its priority selections in the 1979 NHL reclaim draft  
**Canadiens promised to not take Danny Geoffrion and Alain Cote rather than Marc Tardif and/or Richard David in the 1979 NHL reclaim draft

Waivers

Free agents

References

External links
SHRP Sports
The Internet Hockey Database
Hockey Reference
Goalies Archive

Quebec Nordiques season, 1979-80
Quebec Nordiques seasons
Que